Klondike, also known as Canfield, is a card game for one player and the best known and most popular version of the patience or solitaire family, something which "defies explanation" as it has one of the lowest rates of success of any such game. Partly because of that, it has spawned numerous variants including Batsford, Easthaven, King Albert, Thumb and Pouch, Somerset or Usk and Whitehead, as well as the American variants of the games, Agnes and Westcliff. The distinguishing feature of all variants is a triangular layout of the tableau, building in ascending sequence and packing in descending order.

Name 
In the U.S. and Canada, it is so well known that the term Solitaire, in the absence of qualifiers, typically refers to Klondike. Equally in the UK, it is often just known as "Patience". Elsewhere the game is known as American Patience.

Historically Klondike was also called Canfield in America, perhaps because it was a casino game at the Canfield Casino in Saratoga Springs, New York, and this is the name by which it became known in England. Today, however, Canfield is more usually the American name for the patience game called "Demon" in England, which is a different game altogether. Likewise the rumour prevails that this other game was devised by Richard Canfield even though Canfield himself called his game "Klondike".

History 
According to Tung (2015), the game became popular in the late 19th century, and may well have been named "Klondike" after the Canadian region where the Klondike Gold Rush happened in 1896–1899. The earliest rules for the game known as Klondike today appear in the 1907 edition of Hoyle's Games under the name "Seven-Card Klondike". Hoyles calls it a simpler version of "Klondike", also described in the same book, but which turns out to be a gambling version of the game nowadays known as Canfield in the US and Demon elsewhere in the world.

In the 1913 edition of the so-called Official Rules of Card Games, Seven-Card Klondike has become Klondike, with the modification that the pack is run through one card at a time instead of three, and the original Klondike is now being called Canfield.

Klondike's inclusion in Microsoft Windows in the 1990s contributed significantly to its current popularity. It is considered the most popular version of solitaire, which "defies explanation" as the chances of success in getting it out (i.e. winning) are one of the lowest of any patience or solitaire.

Rules 

Klondike is played with a standard 52-card deck, without Jokers. 

After shuffling, a tableau of seven fanned piles of cards is laid from left to right. From left to right, each pile contains one more card than the last. The first and left-most pile contains a single upturned card, the second pile contains two cards, the third pile contains three cards, the fourth pile contains four cards, the fifth pile contains five cards, the sixth pile contains six  cards, and the seventh pile contains seven cards. The topmost card of each pile is turned face up. 

The remaining cards form the stock and are placed facedown at the upper left of the layout.

The four foundations (light rectangles in the upper right of the figure) are built up by suit from Ace (low in this game) to King, and the tableau piles can be built down by alternate colors. Every face-up card in a partial pile, or a complete pile, can be moved, as a unit, to another tableau pile on the basis of its highest card. Any empty piles can be filled with a King, or a pile of cards with a King. The aim of the game is to build up four stacks of cards starting with Ace and ending with King, all of the same suit, on one of the four foundations, at which time the player would have won.
There are different ways of dealing the remainder of the deck from the stock to the waste, including the following:
 Turning three cards at once to the waste, with no limit on passes through the deck.
 Turning three cards at once to the waste, with three passes through the deck.
 Turning one card at a time to the waste, with three passes through the deck.
 Turning one card at a time to the waste with only a single pass through the deck, and playing it if possible.
 Turning one card at a time to the waste, with no limit on passes through the deck.

If the player can no longer make any meaningful moves, the game is considered lost. At this point, winning is impossible.

Probability of winning 

The probability of being able to win a game of Klondike with best-possible play is not known, although Hoyle's Rules of Games suggests the chances of winning as being 1 in 30 games. The inability of theoreticians to precisely calculate these odds has been referred to by mathematician Persi Diaconis as "one of the embarrassments of applied probability".
The best information about the winnability of Klondike concerns a modified version of the game called "Thoughtful Solitaire" or "Thoughtful Klondike", in which the location of all 52 cards is known.
The probability of winning Thoughtful Klondike (with draw three rules) has been calculated as being approximately 82%, more precisely as having a confidence interval of 81.956% ± 0.096%. Thoughtful Klondike is not quite the same as simply playing with all cards face up, as this would allow an impossible movement of a pile if the top downturned card happened to be in sequence with the upturned card underneath it. Using physical cards, Thoughtful Klondike can be played by peeking at the face-down cards or by dealing the downturned cards face-up but sideways to differentiate them from the tableau piles. With electronic programs Thoughtful Klondike can be played by allowing unlimited use of undos to return to the start if a choice turns out to be unfavorable. 
 
Because the only difference between the two games (regular and thoughtful) is the knowledge of card location, all winnable Thoughtful Klondike games will also be winnable in regular Klondike. The win percentage of 82% for Thoughtful Klondike gives an upper bound of 82% on the win percentage of regular Klondike when the location of all cards is unknown.  The true probability with best play might be much smaller, because the difference between a right and wrong move cannot be known in advance whenever more than one move is possible and some cards are still hidden.  Ultimately, very little is known about the winnability of regular Klondike. A Klondike-playing AI using Monte Carlo tree search was able to solve up to 35% of randomly generated regular Klondike games, placing a lower bound on the winnability percentage. One experiment found a skilled player could win 189 out of 442 games (43%), but this gives a discrepancy of almost 40% between regular and Thoughtful Klondike.

Variants

Single deck
Below are some single-pack variants of Klondike:
 Agnes (US variant): the stock is dealt in batches of seven on  reserve piles and every one is available. Furthermore, the bases of the foundations depends on the twenty-ninth card, which is dealt on the foundations.
 Easthaven (less commonly Aces Up,) twenty-one cards are dealt into seven piles of three, two face-down and one face-up. A space in this game may only be filled by a king or sequence starting with a king (several rule sets simplify this and allow any card or sequence to be moved to a vacancy), and when a play goes to a standstill, seven new cards are dealt to the tableau, one top of each pile. Easthaven may be played with 2 or 3 decks. The two-deck version is either called Double Easthaven or Gypsy.
 Nine Across: nine columns of cards are dealt, as opposed to seven in classic Klondike. The player can choose which cards to form the foundations; if one or more eights are exposed, for example, the player may decide to build on eights, and the piles are built up 8-9-10-J-Q-K-Ace-2-3-4-5-6-7. If eights are built on, sevens fill up spaces and so forth. The stock is dealt through one by one as many times as required.
 Somerset or Usk: as Klondike but all the cards are dealt out: 10 in the first row, 9 in the second, and so on until there are 3 in the last.
 Thumb and Pouch: a card in the tableau can be built upon another that is any suit other than its own (e.g. spades cannot be placed over spades) and spaces can be filled by any card or sequence.
 Whitehead: all cards are dealt face up, building is by color (red on red, black on black), a sequence made up of cards that are of the same suit can be moved as a unit, and a space can be filled by any card or sequence.
 Westcliff (US variant): thirty cards are dealt into ten piles of three cards, two face down and one face up. A space in this game can be filled with any card or sequence.
 Kuipers: as Klondike but with eight columns instead of seven, turning one card at a time to the waste, with no limit on passes through the deck. This lowers the probability of winning to approximately 5%.

Tarot deck 
The game can be played with a Tarot-style 78-card deck (such as a Tarot Nouveau).  There are two ways of doing this.  Each has nine increasing tableau stacks.
 Klondike Nouveau Run: use five foundations, and either use the Fool as the first card in the trumps foundation, or remove it before playing.  The Knight or Cavalier (Chevalier) ranks between the Jack and the Queen.
 Klondike Tarot Evens: use six foundations; the usual four, and then use the red knights (cavaliers) as the royals for trumps 1–10, and the black knights as the royals for trumps 11–21.

Gambling variant 
In some casinos, Klondike is turned into a gambling game, by playing with the rule of dealing cards one at a time and going through the stock once.  For example, a player would pay $50 to play, and the house would pay $5 for each card played to the foundations.  This form of Klondike is sometimes called Las Vegas Solitaire.

Joker Solitaire 
Joker Solitaire is a variant of Klondike created by Joli Quentin Kansil which adds two jokers that serve as limited wild cards.  This adds more skill because players are required to make many calculated decisions.

Double Solitaire 
Klondike has been turned into a two player game under the name Double Solitaire.   Players have their own packs and may not play to each other's tableaus, but share their foundations.  Players take turns until they are unable to play a card from their talons.  The first player to play all 52 cards is the winner. Informally, "Double" Solitaire can be played as a party game with more than 2 players.

Computerized versions 
Digital versions of Klondike have helped popularize the game and offer advantages over playing with a physical deck. Notable examples of computerized versions include:
 A software version of Klondike named simply "Solitaire" has been a regular inclusion in the Microsoft Windows operating system, beginning from Windows 3.0 in 1990.  Initially Microsoft included the game as both a diversion and a teaching tool: for many users, Solitaire was their first introduction to using a computer mouse.  Microsoft officials stated in 1994 that "for years, Solitaire was the most-used application for Windows".
 The Atari Program Exchange published Mark Reid's implementation of Klondike for the Atari 8-bit family, simply titled Solitaire, in 1981.
 Michael A. Casteel's shareware version of Klondike for the Macintosh was first released in 1984, and has been continually updated since.
 Klondike was added to Clubhouse Games: 51 Worldwide Classics for Nintendo Switch, a compilation of tabletop games.

Scoring in the Microsoft Windows Solitaire version of Klondike is as follows:

Moving cards directly from the Waste stack to a Foundation scores 10 points.  However, if the card is first moved to a Tableau, and then to a Foundation, an extra 5 points are scored making a total of 15.  Thus to score the most points, no cards should be moved directly from the Waste to Foundation.

Time also plays a role, if the 'Timed game' option is selected. In this case, 2 points are deducted every 10 seconds.  Bonus points are scored using the formula 700,000 ÷ (seconds to finish), if the game takes at least 30 seconds. If the game takes under 30 seconds, no bonus points are awarded.

See also 
 FreeCell
 List of solitaires
 Glossary of solitaire
 Solitaire

References

Notes

Literature 
 Arnold, Peter (2011). Card Games for One. Chambers.
 Coops, Helen Leslie (1939). 100 Games of Solitaire. Whitman. 128 pp.
 Morehead, Albert and Geoffrey Mott-Smith (2001). The Complete Book of Solitaire and Patience. Foulsham, Slough.
 
 

American card games
Articles containing video clips
French deck card games
GNOME Games
Mobile games
Patience video games
Simple packers
Single-deck patience card games